The June 2, 1963, race at Bridgehampton Long Island International Speedway was the fourth racing event of the thirteenth season of the Sports Car Club of America's National Sports Car Championship.

A&B Production Results

References

External links
World Sports Racing Protoytypes
RacingSportsCars.com
Dick Lang Racing History

Bridgehampton